Lake Selina is a natural glacial lake located to the east of Mount Read, in the West Coast Range, on the west coast of Tasmania, Australia.

Its location and conditions have led it be a location of research into Pleistocene and Holocene environments.

It has an estimated surface area of 185,000 square meters and is located close to the Anthony Road B28 that travels between Tullah and Queenstown.

See also

List of reservoirs and dams in Tasmania
List of lakes in Tasmania
List of glacial lakes in Australia

References

Further reading
 

Selina
West Coast Range
Selina